Orleampeth is a legislative assembly constituency in the Union territory of Puducherry in India.
 Orleampeth assembly constituency is a part of Puducherry (Lok Sabha constituency).

Members of Legislative Assembly

Election results

2021

See also
 List of constituencies of the Puducherry Legislative Assembly
 Puducherry district

References 

 

Assembly constituencies of Puducherry